Felisburgo is a Brazilian municipality located in the northeast of the state of Minas Gerais.

The population  was estimated to be 7,504 people living in a total area of 594 km². The city belongs to the mesoregion of Jequitinhonha and to the microregion of Almenara.

Divisópolis is located south of the Jequitinhonha River on a tributary called Rio Rubim de Sul.  The elevation is 638 meters.  It became a municipality in 1962.

Neighboring municipalities are: Rio do Prado, Rubim, Jequitinhonha, Joaíma and Fronteira dos Vales.

The main economic activities are cattle raising and the cultivation of coffee, sugarcane and corn.  The GDP in 2006 was R$19,983,000.  There was 01 banking agency .  In the same year there were 167 automobiles, which was a ratio of one automobile for every 400 people.   In the rural area there were 273 producers of which only 33 had tractors.  There were 27,000 head of cattle in 2006.

This municipality is isolated from major population centers and suffers from drought and poor soils.  
Municipal Human Development Index: .642 (2000)
State ranking: 766 out of 853 municipalities 
National ranking: 3,884 out of 5,138 municipalities 

Degree of urbanization: 72.84% (2000)--the rate for Minas Gerais was 82.0%
Illiteracy rate: 36.16% (15 years old or older) The rate for Minas Gerais was 11.96%; the rate for Brazil was 13.63%
Urban area covered by sewage system: 70.30%--the rate for Minas Gerais was 81.39%
Health clinics, health centers, and hospitals: 02, 02, 01 with 59 beds

References

See also
 List of municipalities in Minas Gerais

Municipalities in Minas Gerais